Enriquillo (also Enriquilla and Petit Trou) is a small town in the Province of Barahona, on the Caribbean coast of the Dominican Republic.

Climate

References 

 

Municipalities of the Dominican Republic
Populated places in Barahona Province